Lawrence Millman (born January 13, 1948, in Kansas City, Missouri) is an adventure travel writer and mycologist from Cambridge, Massachusetts.

He is the author of eighteen books, including Goodbye, Ice: Arctic Poems, Fungipedia, Our Like Will Not Be There Again, Northern Latitudes, Last Places, An Evening Among Headhunters, A Kayak Full of Ghosts, Lost in the Arctic, and Fascinating Fungi of New England. His work has also appeared in Smithsonian, National Geographic Adventure, the Atlantic Monthly, Sports Illustrated. He has won numerous awards, including a Northern Lights Award, a Lowell Thomas Award, an award for the best article on Canada in a U.K. publication (1996), and a Pacific- Asia Gold Travel Award; he has been anthologized in the Best American Travel Writing (Houghton Mifflin) three years in a row.

Millman holds a Ph.D. in Literature from Rutgers University. A fellow of the prestigious Explorers Club, who subsequently resigned from the club, he has made over 40 trips to the Arctic and Subarctic. He has discovered a previously unknown lake in Borneo, and there is a mountain named after him outside Tasiilaq in eastern Greenland.

Millman was close friends with the outdoor writer Elliott Merrick (1905-1997).

References

External links
Lawrence Millman Official Website
Bio from the Yukon Young Writers Conference
Interview with Lawrence Millman

American travel writers
American male non-fiction writers
Writers from Cambridge, Massachusetts
Living people
1948 births
Fellows of the Explorers Club